Hypomecis roboraria, the great oak beauty, is a moth of the family Geometridae. The species occurs in the Palearctic. The nominate subspecies is found in Europe. The subspecies isabellaria is found in western Central Asia east across Siberia and Mongolia to northern China.

The wingspan is 40–50 mm. The male has feather-shaped antennae, the female thread-shaped. The forewings have three narrow, wavy, dark cross-bands that are clear at the front edge, often blurry further back. The hindwings have two such cross bands, one of which is usually quite clear. The larva is naked, brown and gnarled and strongly resembles a dead oak twig. 

The moths fly from May to August.  The caterpillars feed on oak.

Similar species include Hypomecis punctinalis and Hypomecis sp.

Notes
The flight season refers to the Belgium and The Netherlands. This may vary in other parts of the range.

Bibliography

External links

Great oak beauty on UKmoths
Lepiforum.de
Vlindernet.nl 

Boarmiini
Moths of Europe
Taxa named by Michael Denis
Taxa named by Ignaz Schiffermüller